Then Sings My Soul may refer to:

 Then Sings My Soul (album), a 2009 album by Ronnie Milsap
 "Then Sings My Soul", part of the refrain of the hymn How Great Thou Art
Then Sings My Soul, a 1984 film musical/documentary featuring George Beverly Shea
 "Then sings my soul : 150 of the world's greatest hymn stories" a book by Robert J. Morgan